The Long March 2E, also known as the Chang Zheng 2E, CZ-2E and LM-2E, was a Chinese orbital carrier rocket from the Long March 2 family. The Long March 2E was a three-stage carrier rocket that was designed to launch commercial communications satellites into geosynchronous transfer orbit. Launches took place from launch complex 2 at the Xichang Satellite Launch Center.

The Long March 2E made its maiden flight on 16 July 1990. However, the rocket had compatibility flaws with the American-made satellites that caused one launch failures and one partial failure in just 7 missions. The rocket was retired on 28 December 1995 in favor of the Long March 3B. The Long March 2E forms the basis of the Long March 2F, used to launch crewed Shenzhou missions. The booster rockets have also been used on the Long March 3B and Long March 3C.

Launches 
The Long March 2E made its maiden flight on 16 July 1990 and made 7 launches in total. All of the failures were caused by excessive vibration.

The first partial failure occurred on 21 December 1992, during the launch of the original Optus B2. Windshear caused the payload fairing to implode 45 seconds into flight, destroying the satellite. The rocket continued to orbit, deploying what was left of the upper stage and payload into a low Earth orbit. U.S. satellite manufacturer Hughes recommended reinforcement of the fairing. However, China chose not to follow the recommendation and instead added more rivets for the successful launch of Optus B3.

The second failure occurred on 25 January 1995 during the launch of Apstar 2, when the rocket exploded 50 seconds after liftoff. Based on readings from instrumentation that it added to the satellite, Hughes concluded that wind shear had again caused the collapse of a structurally-deficient fairing. However, Liu Jiyuan, the Director of the China Aerospace Corporation, claimed that the rocket-satellite interface was at fault and threatened never to do business with Hughes again. The two sides finally agreed that the interface and the fairing would both be redesigned.

The information provided by Hughes caused great political controversy in the United States, since it could be used to improve Chinese rockets and ballistic missiles. In 1998, the U.S. Congress classified satellite technology as a munition and gave control over export licenses to the State Department under ITAR. No export licenses to China have been approved since 1998, and an official at the United States Bureau of Industry and Security emphasized in 2016 that "no U.S.-origin content, regardless of significance, regardless of whether it's incorporated into a foreign-made item, can go to China".

The return-to-flight payload, AsiaSat 2, had to pay a 27% premium for satellite insurance instead of the usual 17–20%. Although the satellite was delivered to the correct orbit, the launch was a partial failure. Excessive forces during the launch caused a misalignment of the antenna feed horns on the Ku-band transponders, reducing the satellite's coverage area. AsiaSat filed a satellite insurance claim for US$58 million.

After one more successful launch, the Long March 2E was retired at the end of 1995.

List of Launches 

 Original launch attempt on 22 March 1992 at 10:40 UTC was aborted after engine ignition due to one booster engine igniter shutdown after metal contaminants caused electric arcing. Launch vehicle suffered damage and had to be replaced.

 Excessive forces during the launch caused a misalignment of the antenna feed horns on the Ku-band transponders, reducing the satellite's coverage area.

References 

Long March (rocket family)
Vehicles introduced in 1990